Villa María is a small village (caserío) in the San José Department of southern Uruguay.

Geography
Route 3 connects it to the department capital, San José de Mayo,  to the north, as well as to the capitals or main cities of other departments.

Population
In 2011 Villa María had a population of 620.
 
Source: Instituto Nacional de Estadística de Uruguay

References

External links
INE map of Villa Maria

Populated places in the San José Department